The  Pedo-repair RNA motif is a conserved RNA structure identified by using bioinformatics.  It has been detected in only one species of bacteria: Pedobacter sp. BAL39, within the phylum Bacteroidota.  The motif might be in the 5′ untranslated regions of operons containing genes predicted to be involved in DNA repair or related to restriction enzymes.

References

External links
 

Cis-regulatory RNA elements
Non-coding RNA